The Big Four are the four largest professional services networks in the world, the global accounting networks Deloitte, Ernst & Young (EY), KPMG, and PricewaterhouseCoopers (PwC). The four are often grouped because they are comparable in size relative to the rest of the market, both in terms of revenue and workforce; they are considered equal in their ability to provide a wide scope of professional services to their clients; and, among those looking to start a career in professional services, particularly accounting, they are considered equally attractive networks to work in, because of the frequency with which these firms engage with Fortune 500 companies.

The Big Four all offer audit, assurance, taxation, management consulting, actuarial, corporate finance, and legal services to their clients. A significant majority of the audits of public companies, as well as many audits of private companies, are conducted by these four networks.

Until the late 20th century, the market for professional services was actually dominated by eight networks which were nicknamed the "Big Eight". The Big Eight consisted of Arthur Andersen, Arthur Young, Coopers & Lybrand, Deloitte Haskins and Sells, Ernst & Whinney, Peat Marwick Mitchell, Price Waterhouse, and Touche Ross.

The Big Eight gradually reduced due to mergers between these firms, as well as the 2002 collapse of Arthur Andersen, leaving four networks dominating the market at the turn of the 21st century. In the United Kingdom in 2011, it was reported that the Big Four account for the audits of 99% of the companies in the FTSE 100 Index, and 96% of the companies in the FTSE 250 Index, an index of the leading mid-cap listing companies. Such a high level of industry concentration has caused concern, and a desire among some in the investment community for the UK's Competition & Markets Authority (CMA) to consider breaking up the Big Four. In October 2018, the CMA announced it would launch a detailed study of the Big Four's dominance of the audit sector. In July 2020, the UK Financial Reporting Council told the Big Four that they must submit plans by October 2020 to separate their audit and consultancy operations by 2024.

Legal structure 
None of the "firms" within the Big Four is actually a single firm; rather, they are professional services networks. Each is a network of firms, owned and managed independently, which have entered into agreements with the other member firms in the network to share a common name, brand, intellectual property, and quality standards. Each network has established a global entity to co-ordinate the activities of the network.

Until 2020, KPMG was the only Big Four firm not registered as a UK private company, but rather the co-ordinating entity was a Swiss association (verein). However, KPMG International changed its legal structure from a verein to a co-operative under Swiss law in 2003, then to a UK limited company in 2020. For Deloitte, PricewaterhouseCoopers and Ernst & Young, the co-ordinating entity is a UK limited company. Those entities do not themselves perform external professional services, nor do they own or control the member firms. Nevertheless, these networks colloquially are referred to as "firms" for the sake of simplicity and to reduce confusion with lay-people. These accounting and professional services networks are similar in nature to how law firm networks in the legal profession work.

In many cases, each member firm practices in a single country, and is structured to comply with the regulatory environment in that country.

Ernst & Young also includes separate legal entities which manage three of its four geographic areas: the Americas, Asia-Pacific, and EMEIA (Europe, the Middle East, India and Africa) groups, the fourth area being Japan, which has no larger co-ordination branch. These entities coordinate services performed by local firms within their respective areas, but do not perform services or hold ownership in the local entities. There are rare exceptions to this convention; in 2007, KPMG announced a merger of four internationally distinct member firms (in the United Kingdom, Germany, Switzerland and Liechtenstein) to form a single firm, KPMG Europe LLP.

History of mergers 
Since the 1980s, numerous mergers and one major scandal involving Arthur Andersen, have reduced the number of major professional-services firms from eight to four.

Big Eight 
The firms were referred to as the Big Eight for most of the 20th century, reflecting the international dominance of the eight largest firms:
 Arthur Andersen
 Arthur Young
 Coopers & Lybrand
 Deloitte Haskins & Sells
 Ernst & Whinney
 Peat Marwick Mitchell
 Price Waterhouse
 Touche Ross

Most of the Big Eight originated in an alliance formed between UK and US audit firms in the 19th or early 20th centuries. The firms' initial international expansion were driven by the needs of British and American based multinationals for worldwide service. They expanded by forming local partnerships, or by forming alliances with local firms. Arthur Andersen was the exception: the firm originated in the United States, and then expanded internationally by establishing its own offices in other markets, including the United Kingdom.

Price Waterhouse was a UK firm which opened a US office in 1890, and later established a separate US partnership. The UK and US Peat Marwick Mitchell firms adopted a common name in 1925. Other firms used separate names for domestic business, and did not adopt common names until much later. For instance, Touche Ross was named such in 1960, Arthur Young, McLelland, Moores & Co in 1968, Coopers & Lybrand in 1973, Deloitte Haskins & Sells in 1978 and Ernst & Whinney in 1979.  Even now, Deloitte's legal name is Deloitte Touche Tohmatsu Limited, which reflects its history of mergers.

In the 1980s the Big Eight, each with global branding, adopted modern marketing and grew rapidly. They merged with many smaller firms. KPMG was the result of one of the largest of these mergers. In 1987, Peat Marwick merged with the Klynveld Main Goerdeler group to become KPMG Peat Marwick, later known simply as KPMG. Note that this was not the result of a merger between any of the Big Eight.

Big Six 
Competition among these firms intensified, and the Big Eight became the Big Six in 1989. In that year, Ernst & Whinney merged with Arthur Young to form Ernst & Young in June, and Deloitte, Haskins & Sells merged with Touche Ross to form Deloitte & Touche in August.

The Big Six after both mergers occurred were:

Arthur Andersen
Coopers & Lybrand
Deloitte & Touche
Ernst & Young
KPMG
Price Waterhouse

There has been some merging of ancestor firms, in some localities, which would aggregate brands belonging to the Big Four today, but in different combinations than the present-day names would otherwise suggest. For example, the United Kingdom local firm of Deloitte, Haskins & Sells merged instead with the United Kingdom firm of Coopers & Lybrand. The resulting firm was called Coopers & Lybrand Deloitte, and the local firm of Touche Ross kept its original name. It wasn't until the mid-1990s that both UK firms changed their names to match those of their respective international organizations. Meanwhile, in Australia, the local firm of Touche Ross merged instead with KPMG. It is for these reasons that the Deloitte & Touche international organization was known as DRT International (later DTT International), to avoid use of names which would have been ambiguous, as well as contested, in certain markets.

Big Five 
In July 1998, the Big Six became the Big Five when Price Waterhouse merged with Coopers & Lybrand to form PricewaterhouseCoopers.

The Big Five at this point in time were:

Arthur Andersen
Deloitte & Touche
Ernst & Young
KPMG
PricewaterhouseCoopers

Big Four 
Finally, the insolvency of Arthur Andersen stemming from their involvement in the 2001 Enron Scandal produced the Big Four:

Deloitte & Touche (now known as Deloitte)
Ernst & Young (now known as EY)
KPMG
PricewaterhouseCoopers (now known as PwC)

The Enron collapse and ensuing investigation prompted scrutiny of the company's financial reporting and its long time auditor, Arthur Andersen. The company was indicted for obstruction of justice for shredding documents related to the audit of Enron. The resulting conviction, although later overturned, doomed Arthur Andersen, because most clients dropped the firm, and the company was not allowed to take on new clients while they were under investigation. Most of Arthur Andersen’s international practices were sold to members of what is now the Big Four – notably EY globally; Deloitte in the United Kingdom, Canada, Spain, and Brazil; and PwC in China and Hong Kong.

Big Four merger history 
The Big Four were all derived from a series of global mergers, the charts show year of formation through merger, or adoption of single brand name.

Revenue comparison 
In 2010, Deloitte, with its 1.8% growth, was able to outpace PricewaterhouseCoopers' 1.5% growth, gaining "first place" in revenue size, and became the largest firm in the professional services industry. In 2011, PwC re-gained first place with 10% revenue growth. In 2013, these two firms claimed the top two spots with only a $200 million revenue difference, that is, within half a percent. However, Deloitte saw faster growth than PwC over the next few years (largely due to acquisitions) and reclaimed the title of largest of the Big Four in Fiscal Year 2016.

It was estimated that the Big Four had about a 67% share of the global accountancy market in 2012, while most of the rest was divided among so called mid-tier players, such as BDO, Crowe Global and Grant Thornton.

Revenue comparison charts 
Big Four Accounting Firm Revenues (US$ bn)

Revenue gap to largest firm (%)

Revenue gap to largest firm (US$ bn)

Audit & Assurance Revenue (US$ bn)

Tax Revenue (US$ bn)

Consulting & Advisory Revenue (US$ bn)

Criticism

Audit quality and ethics 

A 2019 analysis by Public Company Accounting Oversight Board (PCAOB) in the United States observed that the big four accounting firms bungled almost 31% of their audits since 2009. In another project study on government oversight, it was seen that while the auditors colluded to present audit reports that pleased their clients, the times they didn't resulted in a loss of business. Despite this large-scale collusion in audits, the PCAOB in its 16-year history has only made 18 enforcement cases against the "big four". Although these auditors have failed audits in 31% of cases (808 cases in total), they have only faced action by PCAOB in 6.6% of the cases. KPMG at that point had never been fined despite having the worst audit failure rate of 36.6%.

As per the Financial Reporting Council (FRC) none of the Big Four – Deloitte, EY, KPMG, and PwC managed to surpass the 90% target of its audits. The inefficiency in audit was resulting in a loss of investors' money, people's pension plans, stakeholders' livelihoods and was putting a question mark on the credibility of audited financial statements. "At a time when the future of the audit sector is under the microscope, the latest audit quality results are not acceptable," said Stephen Haddrill, the FRC's Chief executive. Multiple ethics scandals and questionable practices across the globe led to multi-million dollar fines and subsequent settlements by all the Big Four firms.

Despite repeated sanctions from regulators, the Big Four have seen continued challenges to audit quality and ethics as the 2020 decade comes to a close.
In May 2018, KPMG was accused of being "complicit" in signing off Carillion's "increasingly fantastical figures" before Carillion ultimately collapsed.
In January 2020, PwC faces allegations of potential conflict of interest in its audit of Sonangol, given its dual roles of both auditor and consultant.
In September 2020, Deloitte was fined £15 million (US$19.4 million) by the FRC for failing to apply sufficient professional skepticism in its audits of Autonomy's 2009 to 2011 financial statements prior to Autonomy's acquisition by Hewlett-Packard.
In June 2020, EY was accused of poor auditing for failing to discover that €1.9 billion in cash was missing at Wirecard AG, precipitating Wirecard's collapse and eventual sale to Santander Bank for €100 million in November 2020.

Tax avoidance 
According to Australian taxation expert George Rozvany, the Big Four are "the masterminds of multinational tax avoidance and the architects of tax schemes which cost governments and their taxpayers an estimated  a year". At the same time they are advising governments on tax reforms, they are advising their multinational clients on how to avoid taxes.

Market concentration and alleged collusion amongst the Big Four 
In the wake of industry concentration and the occasional firm failure, the issue of a credible alternative industry structure has been raised. The limiting factor on the expansion of the Big Four to include additional firms, is that although some of the firms in the next tier have become quite substantially large, or have formed international networks, effectively all large public companies insist on having an audit performed by a Big Four network. This creates the complication that smaller firms have no way to compete well enough to make it into the top end of the market.

Documents published in June 2010 show that some UK companies' banking covenants required them to use one of the Big Four. This approach from the lender prevents firms in the next tier from competing for audit work for such companies. The British Bankers' Association said that such clauses are rare. Current discussions in the UK consider outlawing such clauses.

In February 2011, the Irish Director of Corporate Enforcement Paul Appleby said that auditors "report surprisingly few types of company law offences to us", with the so-called "big four" auditing firms reporting the least often to his office, at just 5% of all reports.

In 2011, the House of Lords of United Kingdom completed an inquiry into the financial crisis, and called for an Office of Fair Trading investigation into the dominance of the Big Four. In September 2019, Bloomberg News reported that The Big Four controlled 95% of the FTSE 250 audit market by client numbers and 96% by market capitalization in August 2019, according to Adviser Rankings.

In 2018, an Australian parliamentary committee was told that the heads of the Big Four firms have met regularly for dinner. The revelation was among issues which led to an inquiry by the Australian Competition & Consumer Commission into possible collusion in the selling of audit and other services. However, Ernst & Young told the inquiry that the dinners, which were held once or twice a year, were to discuss industry trends and issues of corporate culture such as inclusion and diversity.

The January 2018 collapse of the UK construction and services company Carillion raised further questions about the Big Four, all of which had advised the company before its liquidation. On 13 February 2018, the Big Four were described by Member of Parliament (MP) and chair of the Work and Pensions Select Committee Frank Field as "feasting on what was soon to become a carcass" after collecting fees of £72m for Carillion work during the years leading up to its collapse. The final report of a Parliamentary inquiry into the collapse of Carillion, published on 16 May 2018, accused the Big Four accounting firms of being a "cosy club", with KPMG singled out for its "complicity" in signing off on Carillion's "increasingly fantastical figures" and internal auditor Deloitte accused of failing to identify, or ignoring, "terminal failings". The report recommended the Government refer the statutory audit market to the Competition and Markets Authority (CMA), urging consideration of breaking up the Big Four. In September 2018, Business Secretary Greg Clark announced he had asked the CMA to conduct an inquiry into competition in the audit sector, and on 9 October 2018, the CMA announced it had launched a detailed study. In July 2020, the UK Financial Reporting Council told the Big Four that they must submit plans by October 2020 to separate their audit and consultancy operations by 2024.

See also 
 Accounting network
 Other "Big" industries
 Big Oil
 Big Soda
 Big Tech
 Big Three (automobile manufacturers)
 Big Three (management consultancies)
 Big Tobacco
 LuxLeaks
 Panama Papers
 Professional services network

References

External links 
  — Deloitte
  — Ernst & Young (EY)
  — KPMG
  — PricewaterhouseCoopers (PwC)

Accounting firms
Tax avoidance
Anti-corporate activism